Simon Baker is an aviator and the Chief Flying Instructor at Freedom Sports Aviation (Long Marston, Warwickshire).  He has three times been Microlight World Champion (1996, 1999 & 2003) and six times British Champion.

He has also taken part in several microlighting expeditions, including filming a Channel 4 documentary over Iceland in 1983, flying in the Himalayas near Everest in 1986, and was a pilot/spotter for the ThrustSSC team in Jordan
 and in Black Rock Desert, Nevada.

Titles and awards 

 Fédération Aéronautique Internationale (FAI) Diamond Colibri award for outstanding Microlight or Paramotor achievement, 2008.
 World Microlight Champion, and Gold (dual flexwing, with Anita Holmes) 2003
 British Champion (dual microlight, with Anita Holmes) 2001
 Silver Medal of the Royal Aero Club, 1999 
World Champion, and Gold (dual trike, with Anita Holmes), World Championships 1999 Kecskemet, Hungary
 British Champion, 1998
 World Champion, British Team Gold, and Gold (Weight-Shift Two Seater Class), 1996 World Microlight Championships (Cato Ridge, near Durban, South Africa)

References 

Year of birth missing (living people)
Living people
British aviators